Louis Bélanger (born 1964 in Beauport, Quebec) is a Canadian film director and screenwriter. He has a degree in communications from UQAM. He is a close friend and collaborator of filmmaker Denis Chouinard; both men created several short films together before branching off into their own careers with feature films. His film Post Mortem won him Best Director at the Montreal World Film Festival and earned him two Genie Awards, for best new director and best screenplay.

He began making films and long-form videos while still a student. He shot videos for Télévision Suisse Romande in the late 1990s before turning to directing his first feature, the multi-award winning Post Mortem in 1999. His follow-up was Lauzon-Lauzone, a documentary about the late bad-boy director Jean-Claude Lauzon, and a second feature in 2003, the very assured and mature Gaz Bar Blues. Influenced by the man-of-the-people-docudrama style of John Cassavetes and Ken Loach, he has said that "there aren’t any new stories to tell; all that matters is the telling."

Filmography

Feature films
Post Mortem - 1999
Gaz Bar Blues - 2003
The Genius of Crime (Le génie du crime) - 2006
The Timekeeper (L'Heure de vérité) - 2009
Route 132 - 2010
Bad Seeds (Les Mauvaises herbes) - 2016
Living 100 MPH (Vivre à 100 milles à l'heure) - 2019

Other films
Dogmatisme ou Le songe d'Adrien (Short film co-directed with Denis Chouinard, 1988)
Le soleil et ses traces (Short film co-directed with Denis Chouinard, 1990)
Les galeries Wilderton (Short film, 1991)
Les 14 définitions de la pluie (Short film co-directed with Denis Chouinard, 1993)
Lauzon Lauzone (Documentary, 2000)
Nightlight (TV movie, 2003)
Lies and Deception (TV movie, 2005)

References

External links

1964 births
Living people
French Quebecers
Film directors from Quebec
Canadian screenwriters in French
Writers from Quebec City
Université du Québec à Montréal alumni
Date of birth missing (living people)
Best First Feature Genie and Canadian Screen Award winners
Best Screenplay Genie and Canadian Screen Award winners
Best Director Jutra and Iris Award winners